Mashooq Sultan (born Sultana Bibi; 1952  19 December 2016), was a Pakistani folk singer and the former actress. The recipient of numerous accolades, including, a highest national literary award of Pakistan the Pride of Performance, she is sometimes referred to as "Melody Queen of the Pashto folk music" for her contributions to Pashto music and "Queen of the stage" for representing Pakistan in numerous foreign countries such as the US, the UK, France, Belgium, the UAE and in Afghanistan. As a multilingual singer, she worked in 1,500 albums written in different regional languages such as Urdu, Punjabi, Saraiki and primarily in Pashto language. She is also credited for singing  gazals, and also worked as a playback singer in Pashto films.

Early life
She was born in Swat District's Matta town in Khyber Pakhtunkhwa. When she was a child, her family shifted from Shah Dehrai to Mardan. She was married to Walayat Husain at twelve, with whom she had two daughters and four sons.

Career
When Mashooq was a teen (around sixteen), she first started singing as a wedding singer while performing during wedding ceremonies, and debuted in singing profession in 1962 when a Pakistani radio producer, Nawab Ali Khan Yousafzai  introduced her to the national public broadcaster of the country Radio Pakistan at Peshawar station. Besides radio, she was also associated with Pakistan Television Corporation. Prior to singing, she worked in Pashto films such as Jawargar, Janaan, including her first film Darra Khaibar  and later choose to singing.

She received singing training from one of her neighbors who were affiliated with music, and later Nawab Ali Yousafzai took her audition. After audition, she in a duet musical composition sang with Gulab Sher in a children’s programme, designed for preschoolers. Later she performed in Rafiq Shinwari's folk song titled "Da pah deryab ke sailaboono." (I am drowned in a stream of your worries) by Fazal Ghani Mujahid which was recorded at Radio Pakistan.

Personal life 
During her last days, she experienced extremely difficult circumstances due to poverty and lived in a two-room rented house at Chughalpura, Peshawar. In order to pursuit of better career opportunities in singing, she moved to Peshawar around ten years ago, and subsequently fractured a leg, leading to sold her jewellery for treatment. It is believed she choose "folk singing" over "playback" due to militancy that affected art and music in Khyber Pakhtunkhwa and in one of its administrative units Swat Valley.

In 2008, she alleged provincial government discontinued paying a monthly stipend of Rs. 2,500 (approx. $40) she received since the Pride of Performance was conferred on her.

Awards and accolades 
She was the recipient of sixty medals. In 1996, she was awarded the Presidential Pride of Performance in recognition of her contribution to Pashto music. In 2010, the Chief Minister of Khyber Pakhtunkhwa, Ameer Haider Khan Hoti presented Rs.3,00,000 to Mashooq for her service to Pashto music. In 2015, the Governor of Khyber Pakhtunkhwa, Mehtab Abbasi presented Rs. 500,000 to her in recognition of her contributions to traditional music of Pashto. She was also the recipient of Tamgha-e-Imtiaz award.

Death 
She was suffering from health complications and died in Peshawar on 19 December 2016 of multiple ailments such as hepatitis and diabetes.

References

External links
 

1952 births
Pakistani women singers
20th-century Pakistani actresses
Women ghazal singers
Pakistani radio personalities
Urdu-language singers
Pakistani classical singers
Pashto-language singers
2016 deaths
People from Swat District
Punjabi-language singers
21st-century Pakistani actresses
Musicians from Khyber Pakhtunkhwa
Pakistani folk singers
20th-century Pakistani women singers
Recipients of the Pride of Performance
21st-century Pakistani women singers
Recipients of Tamgha-e-Imtiaz